Thomas Sébastien Pineau (born 31 January 1991) is a Guadeloupean professional footballer who plays as a left-back for the club Solidarité-Scolaire, and the Guadeloupe national team.

Career
Pineau was a youth product of his local club Pointe-à-Pitre and Caen, but retired as a youth due to injuries. He went to Belgium to study physiotherapy, and thereafter worked as a physiotherapist. In January 2018, he was hired to work as  physiotherapist with the Guadeloupe national team by the manager Jocelyn Angloma. He trained and performed regularly with the national team, and his skill caught the attention of Angloma who convinced him to pick up football again and join the national team as a player. At the age of 30, he retired as a physiotherapist to focus on football full-time.

International career
Pineau debuted with the Guadeloupe national team in a 2–0 2021 CONCACAF Gold Cup qualification win over Bahamas on 2 July 2021. He was called up to represent Guadeloupe at the 2021 CONCACAF Gold Cup.

References

External links
 
 

1991 births
Living people
People from Pointe-à-Pitre
Guadeloupean footballers
Guadeloupe international footballers
Association football fullbacks
2021 CONCACAF Gold Cup players